In probability theory, the Skorokhod problem is the problem of solving a stochastic differential equation with a reflecting boundary condition.

The problem is named after Anatoliy Skorokhod who first published the solution to a stochastic differential equation for a reflecting Brownian motion.

Problem statement

The classic version of the problem states that given a càdlàg process {X(t), t ≥ 0} and an M-matrix R, then stochastic processes {W(t), t ≥ 0} and {Z(t), t ≥ 0} are said to solve the Skorokhod problem if for all non-negative t values,
 W(t) = X(t) + R Z(t) ≥ 0
 Z(0) = 0 and dZ(t) ≥ 0
 .

The matrix R is often known as the reflection matrix, W(t) as the reflected process and Z(t) as the regulator process.

See also 
List of things named after Anatoliy Skorokhod

References

Stochastic calculus